Josef "Sepp" Walcher (December 8, 1954 – January 22, 1984) was an Austrian World Cup alpine ski racer. He specialized in the downhill event and won the gold medal at the World Championships in 1978 at Garmisch, West Germany.

Biography

Born in Schladming, Styria, Walcher made his World Cup debut in December 1972, two days after his 18th birthday. Two months later, he scored his first World Cup points (and podium) with a runner-up finish at St. Moritz, Switzerland. Walcher's first World Cup victory came in January 1977 at Morzine, France, his seventh podium. His best two seasons were 1977 and 1978, finishing runner-up to compatriot Franz Klammer in the downhill standings both years. A week prior to his win at the world championships in 1978, Walcher won consecutive downhills at Kitzbühel, Austria.

Walcher retired after the 1982 season with five World Cup victories and thirteen podium finishes. Two years later, he was killed at age 29 in a skiing accident in a benefit race in 1984 at his hometown of Schladming, the race was a 8 km downhill where the skiers started only 30 second one from the each other.

World Cup results

Season standings

Race podiums
 5 wins – (5 DH)
 13 podiums – (13 DH)

World championship results 

From 1948 through 1980, the Winter Olympics were also the World Championships for alpine skiing.

Olympic results  

^ Walcher made the downhill team in 1980 but was dropped the day before the race, replaced by alternate Leonhard Stock, who won the gold medal.

References

External links
 
 
 

1954 births
1984 deaths
Austrian male alpine skiers
Alpine skiers at the 1976 Winter Olympics
Olympic alpine skiers of Austria
Skiing deaths
Sport deaths in Austria
People from Liezen District
Sportspeople from Styria